Saint-Jean-Ligoure is a commune in the Haute-Vienne department in the Nouvelle-Aquitaine region in west-central France.

Geography
The river Briance forms all of the commune's northeastern border.

See also
Château de Châlucet
Communes of the Haute-Vienne department

References

Communes of Haute-Vienne